The Lewisham Odeon was a cinema located in Lewisham, London, England. 

It opened in 1932 as the Gaumont Palace with the films Westward Passage and The Midshipmaid. With 3,050 seats it was among the UK's largest cinemas. 

The building reopened in 1962 as the Lewisham Odeon after being closed for several months due to a fire. Concerts were also staged at the cinema by artists such as David Bowie, Status Quo, Nat King Cole, Johnny Cash, The Beatles, Ray Charles, The Rolling Stones, The Supremes, Rod Stewart, The Clash, The Specials, Adam and The Ants and The Who. 

After closure, the entire building was demolished in 1991 for a road widening scheme.

References

Former cinemas in London
Music venues in London
Odeon Cinemas
Buildings and structures demolished in 1991
Buildings and structures in the London Borough of Lewisham
Demolished buildings and structures in London